The International Journal of Manpower is an academic journal published by the Emerald Group, (formerly MCB University Press), addressing topics in labour economics and human resource planning.

Labour journals
Economics journals
English-language journals
Publications established in 1980
Emerald Group Publishing academic journals
8 times per year journals